Sophy is an alternate spelling of the female given name Sophie, from the name Sophia, meaning "wise".

People with the name 

 Sophy A. Christensen (1867–1955), Danish master carpenter and furniture designer
 Sophy Gray (1814–1871), English diocesan administrator, artist, architect, and horsewoman
 Sophy Mae Mitchell, one of the first women to play in the University of Florida Fightin' Gator Marching Band
 Sophy Parfin (1918–1966), American entomologist
 Sophy Regensburg (1885–1974), American painter
 Sophy Rickett (born 1970), British visual artist
 Sophy Ridge (born 1984), English broadcast journalist and host of Sophy Ridge on Sunday
 Sophy Romvari (born 1990), Canadian film director, writer, and actress
 Sophy Sanger (1881–1950), British internationalist and labour law reformer
 Sophy Wong (born 1992), Hong Kong singer-songwriter also known as SOPHY

Fictional characters 

 Great-Aunt Sophy, a character in the children's fantasy novel The Borrowers by Mary Norton and in the film adaptation
 Sophy, a young girl in the book, The Camomile Lawn, and the adaptation, The Camomile Lawn (TV serial)
 Sophy, the twin protagonist of the second part of Darkness Visible (novel)
 Sophy, a character played by Betty Kean in the 1978 film The Fifth Floor
 Sophy, a character played by Gloria Hope in the lost film The Outcasts of Poker Flat
 Sophy of Kravonia, the protagonist of the novel Sophy of Kravonia by Anthony Hope later adapted into the film Sophy of Kravonia or, The Virgin of Paris starring Diana Karenne in the role
 Sophy Bunker, a French adventuress in Steele MacKaye's 1877 play Won at Last
 Sophy Carson, a character in Mary Barton (TV series) played by Linda Marlowe
 Sophy Crewler, fiancee Tommy Traddles in David Copperfield
 Sophy Cassmajor, the protagonist of Margery Sharp same-named 1934 novel
 Sophy Fairfax, a character played by Lysette Anthony in season 1, episode 8 ("The March Of Time") of Lovejoy
 Sophy Fullgarney, a manicurist in The Gay Lord Quex (play)
 Lady Sophy Horfield, character in The Paradine Case played by Ethel Barrymore
 Sophy Hojo, a character in the PriPara game and anime series voiced by Miyu Kubota
 Sophy Hutton, the vicar's eldest daughter played by Kimberley Nixon in Cranford (TV series)
 Sophy Jackson, the unmarried sister of Sillerton Jackson in Edith Wharton's 1920 novel The Age of Innocence
 Sophy Kwykwer, Marianne Faithfull's character in Ghost Story (1974 film)
 Sophy Murdock, a character in the 1918 American silent film Old Wives for New played by Sylvia Ashton and Wanda Hawley
 Sophy Ninan Varghese, a character played by Mohini in the Indian Malayalam-language film, Naadody
 Sophy Paget-Lombardi, Catherine Schell's character in Strangers episode, "A Swift and Evil Rozzer"
 Mrs Sophy Pullet (née Dodson), a character in George Eliot's The Mill on the Floss
 Sophy Sinclair, a student in Anne's class in L. M. Montgomery's Anne of Windy Poplars
 Sophy Viner, a character in Edith Wharton's 1912 novel, The Reef and played by Alicia Witt in film adaptation

 Sophy the robot, a companion to Musio the robot

Works of fiction 

 The Sophy, a 1641 revenge tragedy by Sir John Denham
 The Grand Sophy, a 1950 historical novel by Georgette Heyer

References

See also 
 Sophie (disambiguation)
 Charles Sophy
 Sophy (Safavid Iran)

Feminine given names